Garbaharey Airport  is an airport serving Garbaharey (also spelled Garbahaareey), the capital city of the Gedo region in Somalia.

Facilities

References

External links
 Aeronautical chart at SkyVector
 

Airports in Somalia
Gedo